The men's singles table tennis event was part of the table tennis programme at the 2016 Summer Olympics in Rio de Janeiro. The event took place from 6 August to 11 August 2016 at Riocentro.

Qualification

Schedule
All times are Brasília Time (UTC−3).

Seeds
Seeds were based on the ITTF World Ranking lists published in July 2016 with a maximum of 2 players per country. The top 16 seeded players qualified directly to the third round.

  (champion, gold medalist)
  (final, silver medalist)
  (quarterfinals)
  (semifinals, bronze medalist)
  (third round)
  (fourth round)
  (semifinals, fourth place)
  (quarterfinals)
  (fourth round)
  (fourth round)
  (third round)
  (third round)
  (third round)
  (third round)
  (third round)
  (third round)

The players seeded from 17 to 32 qualified directly to the second round.

  (quarterfinals)
  (third round)
  (third round)
  (third round)
  (third round)
  (third round)
  (second round)
  (second round)
  (third round)
  (second round)
  (quarterfinals)
  (fourth round)
  (second round)
  (second round)
  (second round)
  (third round)

Draw

Finals

Top half

Section 1

Section 2

Bottom half

Section 3

Section 4

Preliminary rounds

Top half

Section 1

Section 2

Bottom half

Section 3

Section 4

References

External links
 Results Book : Rio 2016. Organising Committee for the Olympic and Paralympic Games in Rio in 2016.
 
 
 2016 Summer Olympics / Table Tennis / Singles, Men. Olympedia.

Men's singles
Men's events at the 2016 Summer Olympics